Greatest Hits is a greatest hits album by British R&B singer and songwriter Billy Ocean, released in 1989. The album features Ocean's biggest hit singles of the 1980s, along with two new singles, "I Sleep Much Better (In Someone Else's Bed)" and "Licence to Chill", the latter of which became Ocean's twelfth and final US top 40 hit to date, reaching No. 32. Greatest Hits became Ocean's best-selling release in the UK, remaining his only album to reach Platinum status there. It has also been certified Platinum in the US.

Track listing

Charts

Weekly charts

Year-end charts

References 

Billy Ocean compilation albums
1989 greatest hits albums
Jive Records compilation albums
RCA Records compilation albums
Albums produced by Robert John "Mutt" Lange